Easy, Down There!  is a 1971 French-Italian comedy film starring Alain and Nathalie Delon.

Plot

Cast 
 Alain Delon as Simon Médieu
 Paul Meurisse  as L'évêque
 Nathalie Delon  as  Rita
 Julien Guiomar  as  Francisco
 Paul Préboist  as  The old choir boy
  Serge Davri as  Brigadier
  Carlo Nell as  Gendarme
 Philippe Castelli  as  Grand vicaire
  Serge Davri as  Brigadier
  André Bollet as  Mickey

References

External links

1971 comedy films
French comedy films
Films directed by Jacques Deray
Films produced by Alain Delon
Films scored by Claude Bolling
1970s French-language films
Italian comedy films
1970s French films
1970s Italian films